Achu-Yelga (Asıwyılğa) is a rural locality (a village) in Kurdymsky Selsoviet, Tatyshlinsky District, Bashkortostan, Russia. The population was 69 as of 2010. There is 1 street.

Geography 
Achu-Yelga is located 35 km west of Verkhniye Tatyshly (the district's administrative centre) by road. Verkhnyaya Barabanovka is the nearest rural locality.

References 

Rural localities in Tatyshlinsky District